Jochen Schweizer (born 23 June 1957) is a German entrepreneur. He founded the eponymous group of companies that offers, among other things, experience vouchers. Schweizer is a pioneer of extreme sports and bungee jumping in Germany. He has worked as a stuntman in films and advertising, set several world records and appears several times in the Guinness Book of World Records.  Schweizer also works as a motivational speaker.

Biography

Education and world records 
Schweizer was born in Ettlingen near Karlsruhe, he grew up in Heidelberg. After the Abitur, he traveled through Africa. Working for an international freight forwarding company, he first led shipments for the Deutsche Gesellschaft für Internationale Zusammenarbeit in West Africa and was subsequently appointed Managing Director of the new branch office in Munich. In the 1980s, Schweizer had various engagements as a stuntman. He performed a bungee jump in Willy Bogner's action film "Fire, Ice and Dynamite". In the following years, Schweizer set several world records, including in 1997 for the jump from a helicopter with the longest bungee rope and the highest fall distance of 1,050 meters. The same year, Schweizer ended his career as a stuntman.

Entrepreneurial activities 
In 1985, Schweizer founded the event and advertising agency Kajak Sports Productions, headquartered in Munich. This company later became the foundation for the Jochen Schweizer Group. Kajak Sports Productions produced several fun sports and action sports movies, such as "Mad Family", "Over the Edge", "Topolinaden" and "Verdon – Die Schlucht gestern und heute". In 1989 the company opened the first stationary facility in Germany, located in Oberschleißheim. It is the oldest still active jumping facility in Europe. In subsequent years the company expanded its activities to include other activities and adventures, such as the vertical catwalk show.

Schweizer's companies faced a major crisis in 2003 due to a fatal accident at the Florianturm in Dortmund. The company changed its business and focused on selling experiences from then on. In 2004 the company started to sell experience vouchers over the Internet. Later, they opened their own stores in Germany, with experience vouchers also sold through trading partners. Today, the Jochen Schweizer Group offers a total of 1,900 different experiences, employs 500 people and achieves an annual turnover of 70 million euros. The company is the market leader for experience vouchers in Germany.

In addition to his position as general manager of the Jochen Schweizer Group, Schweizer is an investor. Jochen Schweizer Ventures is involved in numerous startups. In 2014 and 2015 Schweizer was part of Die Höhle der Löwen on VOX.

Literary works 
In 2010, Schweizer published his biography entitled "Warum Menschen fliegen können müssen" ("Why People Have to Fly"). The book was reviewed positively and appeared in 2014 as an audio book. In 2015 Schweizer published his second book "Der perfekte Moment" ("The Perfect Moment"). It became a bestseller.

References

Further reading

External links 

  
 

1957 births
German performance artists
German stunt performers
Businesspeople from Heidelberg
Living people
Bungee jumpers